Georgina Romero (born January 27, 2003, Maracaibo, Venezuela) artistically known as Sagcy, is a Venezuelan singer and songwriter. She belongs to the Urban Latino Records label.

He has been the opening act for artists such as Sech, Jhay Cortez, Jowell & Randy, Alexis & Fido, Noriel, Lenny Tavarez, among others.

Musical career 
Sagcy officially debuted as a singer on January 18, 2020, launching her first promotional titled "Mala", released on her YouTube channel under the lyric and visualizer video format. The theme climbed positions in the lists of national music billboards (Venezuela) and on digital platforms.

On March 20, 2020, Sagcy presented his second promo and first music video, entitled "Si se da", under the musical production of Josh D'Ace. The video clip was recorded on the streets of Orlando (Florida, United States) and in an exclusive club, while Jay Oc and Bill Martins directed the audiovisual. The following month, Sagcy released its third promo, titled "Te fuiste", a romantic ballad, under the musical production of Cvstillo and Josh D'Ace, with a video clip directed by Jay Oc and Bill Martins.

After the success of "Si se da", the artist launches the #SiSeDaChallenge, where more than 50 singers from the state of Zulia participated to select the talents that would accompany her in the remix of the song. The chosen artists would be Jerry Louis, Liavo and Jaco. "Si se da Remix" arrived on July 20, 2020, on digital platforms, under the musical production of Cvstillo and Josh D'Ace. Sagcy would close the year with the singles "Bailando" and "Beso Violento".

In 2021, when he came of age, he launched his promotional "Latidos". The artist says that the idea for the song was born when she was in the hospital after an operation and she listened to the equipment that monitors the heartbeat. The theme was positioned on the radio billboards of Venezuela in the urban genre.

In April of the same year, Sagcy presented "Sola", under the musical production of Sky Flow and accompanied by a music video directed by Jack Nine Films. A song where the interpreter makes it clear that she "now she is alone and enjoys more." In July, she would say present at the LatinUp Festival. After this, she would release "Elevo", her last single that year.

In 2022, "Controla" arrived, her first dembow and song produced by Chael Produciendo that highlights female empowerment, and "Zum Zum", which she announced would be included on her EP.

Discography

Singles 

 2020: «Mala» 
 2020: «Si se da» 
 2020: «Te fuiste» 
 2020: «Bailando» 
 2020: «Beso violento»
 2021: «Latidos» 
 2021: «Sola» 
 2021: «Elevo»
 2022: «Zum Zum» 
 2022: «Controla» 
 2022: «Jumper» 
 2022: «Mala mía»

References 

Venezuelan singers

Venezuelan women singers

Venezuelan composers

Venezuelan singer-songwriters
2003 births
Living people
Women in Latin music